Nesar (also Romanized as Nes̄ār and Nesār) is a village in Gamasiyab Rural District, in the Central District of Nahavand County, Hamadan Province, Iran. At the 2006 census, its population was 574, in 158 families.

References 

Populated places in Nahavand County